Bob Santos (February 25, 1934 - August 27, 2016) was an American minority-rights activist from Seattle who worked to preserve Seattle's Chinatown and International District. Santos was a member of the Gang of Four and a prominent member of the Filipino American community of Seattle.

Career

During 1960s, the Chinatown–International District, Seattle had become what Santos called a ghetto. Interstate 5 was constructed in middle of the neighborhood and forced several businesses to be demolished. A group of business owners came together to forge change and Santos ended up leading them.

He focused on preserving as much low-income housing as possible and helped lead a group that attempted to prevent construction of the Kingdome and successfully blocked construction of a McDonald's.

He served as the executive director of the International District Improvement Association in the mid-1970s to late 1980s.

He worked as regional director of the United States Department of Housing and Urban Development from 1994 to 2001.

Personal life
His first wife was Anita Agbalog with whom he had six children. In 1992, he married Sharon Tomiko Santos who was elected to the Washington House of Representatives in 1998.

References

1934 births
2016 deaths
Activists from Seattle
American people of Filipino descent